Tetrastemmatidae is a family of worms belonging to the order Monostilifera.

Genera

Genera:
 Africanemertes Stiasny-Wijnhoff, 1942
 Albanemertes Senz, 1993
 Algonemertes Corrêa, 1954
 Cyanophthalma Norenburg, 1986

References

 
Monostilifera
Nemertea families